Ahn Suk-hwan (Hangul: 안석환; real name: Ahn Jin-hyeong (Hangul: 안진형); November 1, 1959) is a South Korean actor. Ahn has been active in theater, film and television since 1986. His onscreen roles include both comedic and villainous supporting turns, among them a ruthless but humane prison warden in the film The Road Taken (2003), and a strict but loving father in the Hong sisters-penned drama Delightful Girl Choon-Hyang (2005).

Filmography

Film

Television series

Theater
The Bald Soprano (2011) 
Cyrano de Bergerac (2010)
University of Laughs (2010)
Noises Off (2006)
Richard III (2004)
Art  (2003)
Gasigogi (A Thorny Fish)  (2001)
Woman of Flames, Na Hye-seok  (2000)
People of the Jurassic  (1998)
이 풍진 세상의 노래 (1998)
Men's Impulse  (1997)
Waiting for Godot (1994-2002)

Awards
2012 1st K-Drama Star Awards: Best Comic Acting (Family)
2005 KBS Drama Awards: Best Supporting Actor (Bizarre Bunch, Delightful Girl Choon-Hyang)
1998 Young Artist of Today Award
1998 34th Dong-A Theatre Awards: Best Actor (Men's Impulse)
1998 National Theater Association of Korea: Best Actor (Excellence Award)
1997 International Theater Festival: Most Popular Theater Actor
1997 National Theater Association of Korea: Most Popular Actor in the First Half of 1997
1997 National Theater Association of Korea: Best Actor (Top Excellence Award)
1996 33rd Dong-A Theatre Awards: Best Actor (이 세상 끄으읕)
1996 Seoul Performing Arts Festival: Grand Prize (Daesang)

References

External links
 Ahn Seok-hwan Fan Cafe at Daum 
 
 
 

People from Paju
South Korean male television actors
South Korean male film actors
Dankook University alumni
Living people
1959 births